Hwang Seok-ho (黄錫鎬, born June 27, 1989) is a South Korean professional footballer who currently plays as a centre back for J1 League club Sagan Tosu.  He won a bronze medal with the Korean men's football team at the 2012 Summer Olympics.

Club statistics
.

Honours

Club 

Sanfrecce Hiroshima

J1 League Champions (2) : 2012, 2013
Japanese Super Cup Winners (1) : 2014
Kashima Antlers

J1 League Champions (1) : 2016
Emperor's Cup Winners (1) : 2016
J. League Cup Winners (1) : 2015

References

External links

 
 

 Profile at Sagan Tosu
 
 

1989 births
Living people
Association football defenders
South Korean footballers
South Korea international footballers
South Korean expatriate footballers
J1 League players
Chinese Super League players
Sanfrecce Hiroshima players
Kashima Antlers players
Tianjin Jinmen Tiger F.C. players
Expatriate footballers in Japan
Expatriate footballers in China
South Korean expatriate sportspeople in Japan
South Korean expatriate sportspeople in China
Footballers at the 2012 Summer Olympics
Olympic footballers of South Korea
Olympic medalists in football
Olympic bronze medalists for South Korea
Medalists at the 2012 Summer Olympics
2014 FIFA World Cup players
People from Cheongju
Shimizu S-Pulse players
Sportspeople from North Chungcheong Province